Michael Burstein (born July 1, 1945) is an Israeli-American actor known onstage as Mike Burstyn. He was born in New York City to the late Yiddish-language actors, Pesach Burstein and Lillian Lux. His first cousin was Borsch Belt comedian, Jay Lester.
Mike began performing on stage at Yiddish theaters from childhood, in musicals and melodramas produced by his father, Pesach Burstein, especially as part of the Four Bursteins. (Mike and his twin sister were billed as Motele and Zisele) in standard Pesach Burstein productions like A Khasene in Shtetl (A Wedding in the Village). He headed out on his own after reaching adulthood, in a bid to reach audiences bigger than the Yiddish stage.

He has performed on television in the United States, Israel, and the Netherlands. He has performed on Broadway, the Yiddish theater, and on the Israeli stage. He had his own show, De Mike Burstyn Show (1978–1981). He was cast as the lead in Israel Becker's The Flying Matchmaker, an Israeli film. In 1981, he took part in the Israeli heats of the Eurovision Song Contest with the song "Sviv kol ha'olam". The song was placed sixth. 

Among his most noted roles in Yiddish theater was the part in his father's production of Itzik Manger's Songs of the Megillah (the longest running Yiddish production to date in Israel, released on Broadway as Megilla of Itzik Manger). 

Burstyn appeared on Broadway in Barnum, where he succeeded Jim Dale in the title role. He was nominated for Drama Desk Awards for his performance as Mayer in The Rothschilds off-Broadway in 1990 and in On Second Avenue in 2005. In 2009, he starred in the title role of the stage adaption by Joseph Bologna's Lansky.

Personal life
Burstyn holds dual Israeli-American citizenship. The Komediant is a documentary recounting the lives and careers of the Burstein family.

References

External links
Official website
Original official website 
Mike Burstyn & Friends YouTube Videos
Mike Burstyn Florida Atlantic University Recorded Sound Archives pages  

GoldenLand Profile

1945 births
American male film actors
20th-century American male singers
20th-century American singers
American male musical theatre actors
American male stage actors
American male television actors
American people of Polish-Jewish descent
American emigrants to Israel
Israeli male film actors
20th-century Israeli male singers
Israeli male musical theatre actors
Israeli male stage actors
Israeli male television actors
Jewish American male actors
Living people
Male actors from New York City
Yiddish-language singers of the United States
Yiddish theatre performers